Peplomyza is a genus of flies in the family Lauxaniidae.

Species
P. dejongi Shatalkin, 2000 
P. intermedia Remm, 1979
P. baumhaueri Loew, 1845
P. litura Meigen, 1826

References

Lauxaniidae
Lauxanioidea genera
Muscomorph flies of Europe